Ewunia gemella is a species of moth of the family Tortricidae that is endemic to Puerto Rico.

References

Moths described in 2002
Endemic fauna of Puerto Rico
Euliini
Moths of the Caribbean
Taxa named by Józef Razowski